Shittah tree (Hebrew: שטה) or the plural "shittim"  was used in the Tanakh to refer to trees belonging to the genera Vachellia and Faidherbia (both formerly classed in Acacia). Faidherbia albida, Vachellia seyal, Vachellia tortilis, and Vachellia gerrardii can be found growing wild in the Sinai Desert and the Jordan River Valley.

In the Exodus, the ancient Israelites were commanded to use "shittah wood" to make various parts of the Tabernacle and of the Ark of the Covenant. This was most likely Vachellia seyal or Vachellia tortilis.

"The wild acacia (Vachellia nilotica), under the name of sunt, everywhere represents the seneh, or senna, of the burning bush. A slightly different form of the tree, equally common under the name of seyal, is the ancient shittah, or, as more usually expressed in the plural form, the shittim, of which the Tabernacle was made."

See also
Frangula purshiana, a North American native plant sharing common names with the Biblical shittah tree
Sideroxylon lanuginosum, a North American native plant sharing common names with the Biblical shittah tree
Xylosma maidenii, an Australian native plant known as shitum wood

References

Further reading

Arthur Penrhyn Stanley, Sinai and Palestine.
Exodus chapter 25, verses 10, 13, 23, and 28.

Book of Exodus
Plants in the Bible
Plant common names
Ark of the Covenant
Vachellia